Sanuki is a placename that may mean:
 Sanuki, Kagawa, a city in Kagawa Prefecture, Japan
 Sanuki Province, a former province of Japan with the same boundaries as modern Kagawa Prefecture
 Sanuki Station, a train station located in Ryūgasaki, Ibaraki, Japan
 Sanuki dialect